The Bramo 323 Fafnir is a nine-cylinder radial aircraft engine of the World War II era. Based heavily on Siemens/Bramo's earlier experience producing the Bristol Jupiter under licence, the Bramo 323 saw limited use.

Design and development
Development of the 323 was the end result of a series of modifications to the original Jupiter design, which Siemens licensed in 1929. The first modifications produced the Sh.20 and Sh.21. The design was then bored out to produce the 950 hp (708 kW) Sh.22 in 1930. Like the Jupiter, the Sh.22 featured a rather "old" looking arrangement with rather prominent valve pushrods on the front of the engine. In the mid-1930s the Reich Air Ministry (RLM) altered the way in which engines were assigned code names, and Bramo was given the 300-block of numbers. Therefore, the Sh.14 and Sh.22 became the 314 and 322, respectively. The 322 never matured and remained unreliable.

The team continued work on the basic design, adding fuel injection and a new supercharger. The reduced power at sea level was inevitable for engines with single-speed, mechanically-driven superchargers when they were regulated to a constant maximum boost pressure below their critical altitude.

The Fafnir powered a number of German prewar designs, including the Focke-Wulf Fw 200, Henschel Hs 126, Dornier Do 24 and Dornier Do 17, as well as the Focke Achgelis Fa 223 Drache helicopter. Its fairly poor fuel economy kept it from more widespread use, and most designs chose the similar BMW 132 instead, whose specific fuel consumption varied between 220 and 240 g/(kW•h) depending on model, whereas the early versions of the Fafnir got about 255 g/(kW•h), a poor figure for the era. The C/Ds, where the supercharger used less power, improved this to 230 g/(kW•h), but were only useful at lower altitudes.

BMW bought Bramo in 1939 and continued production to supply the small number of designs that already used it, notably the Do 17. The naming at this point becomes somewhat confusing, with BMW, Bramo and Fafnir being used almost interchangeably depending on the source. 5,500 were produced before the lines were shut down in 1944.

The original 323 design was produced in A and B models, differing in the direction they turned. The engines were intended to be installed in A/B pairs, thereby eliminating engine torque across a twin-engine aircraft. The similar C and D models featured a lower supercharger gearing for better performance at lower altitudes, improving takeoff power to 1,000 PS, but reducing the critical altitude.

The final versions, P, R and T, featured a two-speed supercharger for better all-around performance. The R-2 subtype added MW 50 water-methanol injection for added low-altitude performance, boosting power to 1,200 PS at 2,600 rpm.

Variants
323A(RH rotation)
323Bsame as A but opposite rotation.(LH rotation)
323Clower powered supercharge  for take-off. (RH rotation)
323Dsame as C but opposite rotation. (LH rotation)
323J(RH rotation)
323M(RH rotation)
323P2-speed supercharger:-  at 
323R
323R-2with 'C3' 96 octane fuel injection  at 2,600 rpm
323T

Applications
 Arado Ar 196
 Arado Ar 232
 Blohm & Voss BV 222
 Dornier Do 17
 Dornier Do 24
 Focke Achgelis Fa 223
 Focke-Wulf Fw 200
 Henschel Hs 126
 Junkers Ju 352

Specifications (BMW-Bramo 323J)

See also
 List of aircraft engines

Notes

Further reading

External links

German language article on the Bramo 323 with images

Aircraft air-cooled radial piston engines
BMW aircraft engines
1930s aircraft piston engines